The following is a list of United States ambassadors, or other chiefs of mission, to Paraguay. The title given by the United States State Department to this position is currently Ambassador Extraordinary and Minister Plenipotentiary.

See also
Paraguay–United States relations
Foreign relations of Paraguay
Ambassadors of the United States

References

United States Department of State: Background notes on Paraguay

External links
 United States Department of State: Chiefs of Mission for Paraguay
 United States Department of State: Paraguay
 United States Embassy in Asuncion
 PDF of Ambassador James H. Thessin's Nomination Testimony

Paraguay

United States